The area of Karachi in Sindh, Pakistan has a natural harbor and has been used as fishing port by local fisherman belonging to Sindhi tribes since prehistory. Archaeological excavations have uncovered a period going back to Indus valley civilisation which shows the importance of the port since the Bronze Age. The port city of Banbhore was established before the Christian era which served as an important trade hub in the region, the port was recorded by various names by the Greeks such as Krokola, Morontobara port, and Barbarikon, a sea port of the Indo-Greek Bactrian kingdom and Ramya according to some Greek texts. The Arabs knew it as the port of Debal, from where Muhammad bin Qasim led his conquering force into Sindh (the western corner of South Asia) in AD 712.  Lahari Bandar or Lari Bandar succeeded Debal as a major port of the Indus; it was located close to Banbhore, in modern Karachi. The first modern port city near Manora Island (now Manora Peninsula) was established during British colonial Raj in the late 19th century.

Names 
The ancient names of Karachi included: Krokola, Barbarikon, Nawa Nar, Rambagh, Kurruck, Karak Bander, Auranga Bandar, Minnagara, Kalachi, Morontobara, Kalachi-jo-Goth, Banbhore, Debal, Barbarice and Kurrachee.

Early History

Pre history 
The Late Paleolithic and Mesolithic sites found by Karachi University team on the Mulri Hills, in front of Karachi University Campus, constitute one of the most important archaeological discoveries made in Sindh during the last fifty years. The last hunter-gatherers, who left abundant traces of their passage, repeatedly inhabited the Hills. Some twenty different spots of flint tools were discovered during the surface surveys.

Indus Valley Civilisation 
Ahladino and Pir Shah Jurio are the archaeological sites from the Indus Valley civilisation periods situated in Karachi district. Floor tiles of a house have been discovered at this site of Ahladino.

Greeks Visitors 
The Greeks recorded the place by many names: Krokola, the place where Alexander camped to prepare a fleet for Babylon after his campaign in the Indus Valley; Morontobara, from whence Alexander's admiral Nearchus set sail; and Barbarikon, a port of the Bactrian kingdom.

Debal and Bhanbhore

Debal and Bhanbhore were the ancient port cities established near present-day modern city of Karachi. It dates back to the Scytho-Parthian era and was later controlled by Hindu Buddhist kingdoms before falling into Arab possession in the 8th century CE. In the 13th century it was abandoned Remains of one of the earliest known mosques in the region dating back to 727 AD are still preserved in the city. Strabo mentions export of Rice from near present day Karachi and Gulf of Cambay) to Arabia.

According to Biladuri, A large minaret of a temple existed in Debal whose upper portion was knocked down by Ambissa Ibn Ishak and converted into prison. and at the same time began to repair the ruined town with the stones of minaret.

Post Islamic era (8th century AD - 19th century)

Muhammad bin Qasim 
In AD 711, Muhammad bin Qasim conquered the Sindh and Indus Valley, bringing South Asian societies into contact with Islam, succeeding partly because Raja Dahir was a Hindu king that ruled over a Buddhist majority and that Chach of Alor and his kin were regarded as usurpers of the earlier Buddhist Rai dynasty this view is questioned by those who note the diffuse and blurred nature of Hindu and Buddhist practices in the region, especially that of a royalty to be patrons of both and those who believe that Chach himself may have been a Buddhist. The forces of Muhammad bin Qasim defeated Raja Dahir in alliance with the Jats and other regional governors.

Mughal empire 
During the rule of the Mughal administrator of Sindh, Mirza Ghazi Beg the city was well fortified against Portuguese colonial incursions in Sindh. Debal and the Manora Island and was visited by Ottoman admiral Seydi Ali Reis and mentioned in his  there. Fernão Mendes Pinto also claims that Sindhi sailors joined the Ottoman Admiral Kurtoğlu Hızır Reis on his voyage to Aceh. Debal was also visited by the British travel writers such as Thomas Postans and Eliot, who is noted for his vivid account on the city of Thatta.

Karak Bander 
In the seventeenth century, Karak Bander was a small port on the Arabian Sea on the estuary of the Hub River, 40 km west of present-day Karachi. It was a transit point for the South Asian-Central Asian trade. The estuary silted up due to heavy rains in 1728 and the harbour could no longer be used. As a result, the merchants of Karak Bander decided to relocate their activities to what is today known as Karachi. Trade increased between 1729 and 1839 because of the silting up of Shahbandar and Keti Bandar (important ports on the Indus River) and the shifting of their activities to Karachi.

Kolachii 

The present city of Karachi was reputedly founded as "Kolachi" by Baloch tribes from Makran, Balochistan, who established a small fishing community in the area. Descendants of the original community still live in the area on the small island of Abdullah Goth, which is located near the Karachi Port. The original name "Kolachi" survives in the name of a well-known Karachi locality named Mai Kolachi. Mirza Ghazi Beg, the Mughal administrator of Sindh, is among the first historical figures credited for the development of coastal Sindh (consisting of regions such as the Makran coast and the Indus delta), including the cities of Thatta.

This settlement was reputedly founded by Baloch tribes from Balochistan and Makran in 1729 as the settlement of Kolachi. According to legend, the city started as a fishing settlement, where a fisherwoman, Mai Kolachi, settled and started a family. The village that grew out of this settlement was known as Kolachi-jo-Goth (The Village of Kolachi in Sindhi). When Sindh started trading across the sea with Muscat and the Persian Gulf in the late 18th century, Karachi gained in importance; a small fort was constructed for its protection with a few cannons imported from Muscat. The fort had two main gateways: one facing the sea, known as Khara Dar (Brackish Gate) and the other facing the adjoining Lyari river, known as the Meetha Dar (Sweet Gate). The location of these gates corresponds to the present-day city localities of Khaaradar (Khārā Dar) and Meethadar (Mīṭhā Dar) respectively. The Soomra dynasty, Samma Dynasty, Arghun Dynasty, Tarkhan and Talpur dynasties ruled Sindh.

Kalhora dynasty 
During the reign of the Kalhora dynasty the present city started life as a fishing settlement when a Balochi fisher-woman called Mai Kolachi took up residence and started a family. The city was an integral part of the Talpur dynasty in the 1720s.

The name Karachee was used for the first time in a Dutch document from 1742, in which a merchant ship de Ridderkerk is shipwrecked near the original settlement. The city continued to be ruled by the Talpur Amir's of Sindh until it was occupied by Bombay Army under the command of John Keane on 2 February 1839.

Talpur period 
In 1795, Kolachi-Jo-Goth passed from the control of the Khan of Kalat, Kalat to the Talpur rulers of Sindh. The British, venturing and enterprising in South Asia opened a small factory here in September 1799, but it was closed down within a year because of disputes with the ruling Talpurs. However, this village by the mouth of the Indus river had caught the attention of the British East India Company, who, after sending a couple of exploratory missions to the area, conquered the town on February 3, 1839.
In the eighteenth century Karachi was occupied by the Kalhora dynasty, handed over by them to the Khan of Kalat as blood money for the killing of his brother by the Kalhoras, and finally taken over by the Talpur dynasty. In 1838, the British occupied it to use it for launching their campaigns against the Russian Empire in Central Asia and Afghanistan.

Colonial period (1839 - 1947)

Company rule 
After sending a couple of exploratory missions to the area, the British East India Company conquered the town on February 3, 1839. The town was later annexed to the British Indian Empire when Sindh was conquered by Charles James Napier in the Battle of Miani on February 17, 1843. Karachi was made the capital of Sindh in the 1840s. On Napier's departure it was added along with the rest of Sindh to the Bombay Presidency, a move that caused considerable resentment among the native Sindhis. The British realised the importance of the city as a military cantonment and as a port for exporting the produce of the Indus River basin, and rapidly developed its harbour for shipping. The foundations of a city municipal government were laid down and infrastructure development was undertaken. New businesses started opening up and the population of the town began rising rapidly.

The arrival of troops of the Kumpany Bahadur in 1839 spawned the foundation of the new section, the military cantonment. The cantonment formed the basis of the 'white' city where the Indians were not allowed free access. The 'white' town was modeled after English industrial parent-cities where work and residential spaces were separated, as were residential from recreational places.

Karachi was divided into two major poles. The 'black' town in the northwest, now enlarged to accommodate the burgeoning Indian mercantile population, comprised the Old Town, Napier Market and Bunder, while the 'white' town in the southeast comprised the Staff lines, Frere Hall, Masonic lodge, Sindh Club, Governor House and the Collectors Kutchery [Law Court]  located in the Civil Lines Quarter. Saddar bazaar area and Empress Market were used by the 'white' population, while the Serai Quarter served the needs of the 'black' town.

The village was later annexed to the British Indian Empire when the Sindh was conquered by Charles Napier in 1843. The capital of Sindh was shifted from Hyderabad to Karachi in the 1840s. This led to a turning point in the city's history. In 1847, on Napier's departure the entire Sindh was added to the Bombay Presidency. The post of the governor was abolished and that of the Chief Commissioner in Sindh established.

The British realized its importance as a military cantonment and a port for the produce of the Indus basin, and rapidly developed its harbor for shipping. The foundation of a city municipal committee was laid down by the Commissioner in Sinde, Bartle Frere and infrastructure development was undertaken. Consequently, new businesses started opening up and the population of the town started rising rapidly. Karachi quickly turned into a city, making true the famous quote by Napier who is known to have said: Would that I could come again to see you in your grandeur!

In 1857, the Indian Mutiny broke out in South Asia and the 21st Native Infantry stationed in Karachi declared allegiance to rebels, joining their cause on 10 September 1857. Nevertheless, the British were able to quickly reassert control over Karachi and defeat the uprising. Karachi was known as Khurachee Scinde (i.e. Karachi, Sindh) during the early British colonial rule.

British Raj 

In 1795, the village became a domain of the Balochi Talpur rulers. A small factory was opened by the British in September 1799, but was closed down within a year. In 1864, the first telegraphic message was sent from India to England when a direct telegraph connection was laid between Karachi and London. In 1878, the city was connected to the rest of British India by rail. Public building projects such as Frere Hall (1865) and the Empress Market (1890) were undertaken. In 1876, Muhammad Ali Jinnah, the founder of Pakistan, was born in the city, which by now had become a bustling city with Temples, mosques, churches, courthouses, markets, paved streets and a magnificent harbour. By 1899, Karachi had become the largest wheat exporting port in the east. The population of the city was about 105,000 inhabitants by the end of the 19th century, with a cosmopolitan mix of Muslims, Hindus, Europeans, Jews, Parsis, Iranians, Lebanese, and Goans. The city faced a huge cholera epidemic in 1899. By around the start of the 20th century, the city faced street congestion, which led to South Asia's first tramway system being laid down in 1900.

The city remained a small fishing village until the British seized control of the offshore and strategically located at Manora Island. Thereafter, authorities of the British Raj embarked on a large-scale modernisation of the city in the 19th century with the intention of establishing a major and modern port which could serve as a gateway to Punjab, the western parts of British Raj, and Afghanistan. The city was predominantly Muslim with Sindhi and Baloch ethnic groups. Britain's competition with imperial Russia during the Great Game also heightened the need for a modern port near Central Asia, and so Karachi prospered as a major centre of commerce and industry during the Raj, attracting communities of: Africans, Arabs, Armenians, Catholics from Goa, Jews, Lebanese, Malays, Konkani people from Maharashtra, Kuchhi from Kuchh, Gujarat in India, and Zoroastrians (also known as Parsees)—in addition to the large number of British businessmen and colonial administrators who established the city's poshest locales, such as Clifton. This mass migration changed the religious and cultural mosaic of Karachi.

British colonialists embarked on a number of public works of sanitation and transportation, such as gravel paved streets, proper drains, street sweepers, and a network of trams and horse-drawn trolleys. Colonial administrators also set up military camps, a European inhabited quarter, and organised marketplaces, of which the Empress Market is most notable. The city's wealthy elite also endowed the city with a large number of grand edifices, such as the elaborately decorated buildings that house social clubs, known as 'Gymkhanas.' Wealthy businessmen also funded the construction of the Jehangir Kothari Parade (a large seaside promenade) and the Frere Hall, in addition to the cinemas, and gambling parlours which dotted the city.

By 1914, Karachi had become the largest grain exporting port of the British Empire. In 1924, an aerodrome was built and Karachi became the main airport of entry into British Raj. An airship mast was also built in Karachi in 1927 as part of the Imperial Airship Communications scheme, which was later abandoned. In 1936, Sindh was separated from the Bombay Presidency and Karachi was made again the capital of the Sindh. In 1947, when Pakistan achieved independence, Karachi had become a bustling metropolitan city with beautiful classical and colonial European styled buildings lining the city's thoroughfares.

As the movement for independence almost reached its conclusion, the city suffered widespread outbreaks of communal violence between Muslims and Hindus, who were often targeted by the incoming Muslim refugees. In response to the perceived threat of Hindu domination, self-preservation of identity, the province of Sindh became the first province of British India to pass the Pakistan Resolution, in favour of the creation of the Pakistani state. The  Muslim population supported Muslim League and Pakistan Movement. After the independence of Pakistan in 1947, Hindus and Sikhs migrated to India and this led to the decline of Karachi, as Hindus controlled the business in Karachi, while the Muslim refugees from India settled down in Karachi. While many poor low caste Hindus, Christians, and wealthy Zoroastrians (Parsees) remained in the city, Karachi's Sindhi Hindu migrated to India and was replaced by Muslim refugees who, in turn, had been uprooted from regions belonging to India.

Post-Independence (1947 CE – present)

Pakistan's capital (1947–1958)

Karachi was chosen as the capital city of Pakistan. After the independence of Pakistan, the city population increased dramatically when hundreds of thousands of Muslim refugees from India fleeing from anti-Muslim pogroms and from other parts of South Asia came to settle in Karachi. As a consequence, the demographics of the city also changed drastically. The Government of Pakistan through Public Works Department bought land to settle the Muslim refugees. However, it still maintained a great cultural diversity as its new inhabitants arrived from the different parts of the South Asia. In 1959, the capital of Pakistan was shifted from Karachi to Islamabad. Karachi remained a federal territory and became the capital of Sindh in 1970 by general Yahya khan.

Cosmopolitan city (1970–1980)

During the 1960s, Karachi was seen as an economic role model around the world. Many countries sought to emulate Pakistan's economic planning strategy and one of them, South Korea, copied the city's second "Five-Year Plan" and World Financial Centre in Seoul is designed and modeled after Karachi.

The 1965 Pakistani presidential election disturbance and political movement against President Muhammad Ayub Khan started of a long period of decline in the city. The city's population continued to grow exceeding the capacity of its creaking infrastructure and increased the pressure on the city.

The 1970s saw major labour struggles in Karachi's industrial estates. During the administration of Prime Minister Zulfikar Ali Bhutto riots and Karachi labour unrest of 1972 caused major decline in economic development. During President Muhammad Zia-ul-Haq's martial law, Karachi saw relative peace and prosperity, specially during the 3 years of Major General Mahmood Aslam Hayat, as Deputy Martial Law Administrator Karachi from 1977 to 1980.

Post 1970s–present
The 1980s and '90s also saw an influx of Afghan refugees from the Soviet–Afghan War into Karachi, and the city. Political tensions between the Muslim refugees and other groups also erupted and the city was wracked with political violence. The period from 1992 to 1994 is regarded as the bloody period in the history of the city, when the Army commenced its Operation Clean-up against the Mohajir Qaumi Movement.

Since the last couple of years however, most of these tensions have largely been quieted. Karachi continues to be an important financial and industrial centre for the Sindh and handles most of the overseas trade of Pakistan and the Central Asian countries. It accounts for a large portion of the GDP of Sindh, Pakistan and a large chunk of the country's white collar workers. Karachi's population has continued to grow and is estimated to have exceeded 15 million people. Currently, Karachi is a melting pot where people from all the different parts of Pakistan live. The Sindh government is undertaking a massive upgrading of the city's infrastructure which promises to again put this heart of Sindh city of Karachi into the lineup of one of the world's greatest metropolitan cities.

The last census was held in 1998, the current estimated population ratio of 2017 is:
Muhajirs: 44%
Sindhi: 8%
Punjabi: 14%
Pashto:  20%
Balochi: 4%

The others include Konkani, Kuchhi, Gujarati, Dawoodi Bohra, Memon, Brahui, Makrani, Khowar, Burushaski, Arabic, and Bengali. Karachi is home to a wide array of non-Urdu speaking Muslim peoples from what is now the Republic of India. The city has a sizable community of Gujarati, Marathi, Konkani-speaking refugees. Karachi is also home to a several-thousand member strong community of Malabari Muslims from Kerala in South India. Karachi is the largest Bengali speaking city outside Bengal region. These ethno-linguistic groups are being assimilated in the Urdu-speaking community Muhajirs.
In 2011, an estimated 2.5 million foreign migrants lived in the city, mostly from Afghanistan, Bangladesh, Myanmar, and Sri Lanka.

Picture gallery

See also

 Demographic history of Karachi
 Abdullah Shah Ghazi
 Bhambore
 Culture of Karachi
 Debal
 Demographics of Karachi
 Economy of Karachi
 Education in Karachi
 History of Pakistan
 History of Sindh
 Karachi
 Kolachi jo Goth
 Kolachi
 Krokola
 Kulachi (tribe)
 Mai Kolachi
 Morontobara
 Muhammad bin Qasim
 Politics of Karachi
 Timeline of Karachi history
 Timeline of Karachi

References

External links
A story behind every name
History of Karachi with old & new Pictures 
'Traitor of Sindh' Seth Naomal: A case of blasphemy in 1832 
The real Father of Karachi (it's not who you think) 
The real Father of Karachi — II
Of streets and names
Harchand Rai Vishan Das: Karachi's beheaded benefactor 
Karachi's Polo Ground: Digging into history 
Ranchor Line: 14 acres of an abandoned identity 
Mr. Strachan and Maulana Wafaai 
The Clifton of yore
Karachi's Ranchor Line: Where red chilli is no more